Marion Dix Sullivan (1802–1860) (fl. 1840–50) was an American songwriter and composer. She was born in Boscawen, New Hampshire, the daughter of Timothy Dix and Abigail Wilkins and the sister of General John Adams Dix of New York. She married John Whiting Sullivan in 1825 and had one son, John Henry, who died of drowning in 1858.

Little is known about her background, but she was considered the first American woman to write a "hit" song, "The Blue Juniata," which was referenced by Mark Twain in his autobiography. The Blue Juniata was the basis for variation sets by other well-known 19th century American composers, such as Charles Grobe and J. Edgar Gould. The song was recorded in 1937 by Roy Rogers and the early Sons of the Pioneers. The song was also referenced with the full lyrics by Laura Ingalls Wilder in her book Little House on the Prairie.

Works

Marion Dix wrote ballads and sacred songs. Selected works include:
The Blue Juniata (1844)
Marion Day (1844)
Jessee Cook, the Lily of the Wood (1844)Oh! Boatman, Row Me O'er the Stream (1846)Cold Blew the Night Wing : The Wanderer (1846)The Cold Has Bound the Joyous Stream (1846)The Evening Bugle (1847)The Field of Monterey (1848)Mary Lindsey (1848)The Strawberry Girl (1850)We Cross the Prairies of Old (1854)The Kansas Home (1854)Juniata Ballads, compilation (1855)Bible Songs, compilation (1856)Bright Alfarata (1871?)Lightly OnEvening Hymn to the Savior''

References

External links
 Sons Of The Pioneers - Blue Juniata (1937) from YouTube.

1802 births
1860 deaths
19th-century classical composers
American women classical composers
American classical composers
Musicians from New Hampshire
People from Boscawen, New Hampshire
19th-century American composers
19th-century American women musicians
19th-century women composers